Karl Ludwig von Bertalanffy (19 September 1901 – 12 June 1972) was an Austrian biologist known as one of the founders of general systems theory (GST). This is an interdisciplinary practice that describes systems with interacting components, applicable to biology, cybernetics and other fields. Bertalanffy proposed that the classical laws of thermodynamics might be applied to closed systems, but not necessarily to "open systems" such as living things. His mathematical model of an organism's growth over time, published in 1934, is still in use today.

Bertalanffy grew up in Austria and subsequently worked in Vienna, London, Canada, and the United States.

Biography 
Ludwig von Bertalanffy was born and grew up in the little village of Atzgersdorf (now Liesing) near Vienna. The Bertalanffy family had roots in the 16th century nobility of Hungary which included several scholars and court officials. His grandfather Charles Joseph von Bertalanffy (1833–1912) had settled in Austria and was a state theatre director in Klagenfurt, Graz and Vienna, which were important sites in imperial Austria. Ludwig's father Gustav von Bertalanffy (1861–1919) was a prominent railway administrator. On his mother's side Ludwig's grandfather Joseph Vogel was an imperial counsellor and a wealthy Vienna publisher. Ludwig's mother Charlotte Vogel was seventeen when she married the thirty-four-year-old Gustav. They divorced when Ludwig was ten, and both remarried outside the Catholic Church in civil ceremonies.

Ludwig von Bertalanffy grew up as an only child educated at home by private tutors until he was ten. When he arrived at his Gymnasium (a form of grammar school) he was already well habituated in learning by reading, and he continued to study on his own. His neighbour, the famous biologist Paul Kammerer, became a mentor and an example to the young Ludwig.

In 1918, Bertalanffy started his studies at the university level in philosophy and art history, first at the University of Innsbruck and then at the University of Vienna. Ultimately, Bertalanffy had to make a choice between studying philosophy of science and biology; he chose the latter because, according to him, one could always become a philosopher later, but not a biologist. In 1926 he finished his PhD thesis (Fechner und das Problem der Integration höherer Ordnung, translated title: Fechner and the Problem of Higher-Order Integration) on the psychologist and philosopher Gustav Theodor Fechner. For the next six years he concentrated on a project of "theoretical biology" which focused on the philosophy of biology. He received his habilitation in 1934 in "theoretical biology".

Bertalanffy was appointed Privatdozent at the University of Vienna in 1934. The post yielded little income, and Bertalanffy faced continuing financial difficulties. He applied for promotion to the status of associate professor, but funding from the Rockefeller Foundation enabled him to make a trip to Chicago in 1937 to work with Nicolas Rashevsky. He was also able to visit the Marine Biological Laboratory in Massachusetts.

Bertalanffy was still in the US when he heard of the Anschluss in March 1938. However, his attempts to remain in the US failed, and he returned to Vienna in October of that year. Within a month of his return, he joined the Nazi Party, which facilitated his promotion to professor at the University of Vienna in 1940. During the Second World War, he linked his "organismic" philosophy of biology to the dominant Nazi ideology, principally that of the Führerprinzip.

Following the defeat of Nazism, Bertalanffy found denazification problematic and left Vienna in 1948. He moved to the University of London (1948–49); the Université de Montréal (1949); the University of Ottawa (1950–54); the University of Southern California (1955–58); the Menninger Foundation (1958–60); the University of Alberta (1961–68); and the State University of New York at Buffalo (SUNY) (1969–72).

In 1972, he died from a heart attack.

Family life
Bertalanffy met his wife, Maria, in April 1924 in the Austrian Alps. They were hardly ever apart for the next forty-eight years. She wanted to finish studying but never did, instead devoting her life to Bertalanffy's career. Later, in Canada, she would work both for him and with him in his career, and after his death she compiled two of Bertalanffy's last works. They had one child, a son who followed in his father's footsteps by making his profession in the field of cancer research.

Work 
Today, Bertalanffy is considered to be a founder and one of the principal authors of the interdisciplinary school of thought known as general systems theory. According to Weckowicz (1989), he "occupies an important position in the intellectual history of the twentieth century. His contributions went beyond biology, and extended into cybernetics, education, history, philosophy, psychiatry, psychology and sociology. Some of his admirers even believe that this theory will one day provide a conceptual framework for all these disciplines".

Individual growth model 
The individual growth model published by Ludwig von Bertalanffy in 1934 is widely used in biological models and exists in a number of permutations.

In its simplest version the so-called Bertalanffy growth equation is expressed as a differential equation of length (L) over time (t):

when  is the Bertalanffy growth rate and  the ultimate length of the individual. This model was proposed earlier by August Friedrich Robert Pūtter (1879-1929), writing in 1920.

The dynamic energy budget theory provides a mechanistic explanation of this model in the case of isomorphs that experience a constant food availability. The inverse of the Bertalanffy growth rate appears to depend linearly on the ultimate length, when different food levels are compared. The intercept relates to the maintenance costs, the slope to the rate at which reserve is mobilized for use by metabolism. The ultimate length equals the maximum length at high food availabilities.

Bertalanffy equation 
The Bertalanffy equation is the equation that describes the growth of a biological organism. The equation was offered by Ludwig von Bertalanffy in 1969.

Here W is organism weight, t is the time, S is the area of organism surface, and V is a physical volume of the organism.

The solution of the Bertalanffy equation is the function:

But the Bertalanffy equation is a special case of the Tetearing equation, that is a more general equation of the growth of a biological organism.

Bertalanffy module
To honour Bertalanffy, ecological systems engineer and scientist Howard T. Odum named the storage symbol of his General Systems Language as the Bertalanffy module (see image right).

General system theory 
The biologist is widely recognized for his contributions to science as a systems theorist; specifically, for the development of a theory known as general system theory (GST). The theory attempted to provide alternatives to conventional models of organization. GST defined new foundations and developments as a generalized theory of systems with applications to numerous areas of study, emphasizing holism over reductionism, organism over mechanism.

Foundational to GST are the inter-relationships between elements which all together form the whole.

Open systems 

Bertalanffy's contribution to systems theory is best known for his theory of open systems. The system theorist argued that traditional closed system models based on classical science and the second law of thermodynamics were inadequate for explaining large classes of phenomena. Bertalanffy maintained that "the conventional formulation of physics are, in principle, inapplicable to the living organism being open system having steady state. We may well suspect that many characteristics of living systems which are paradoxical in view of the laws of physics are a consequence of this fact." However, while closed physical systems were questioned, questions equally remained over whether or not open physical systems could justifiably lead to a definitive science for the application of an open systems view to a general theory of systems. His 1950 publication in the journal Science introduced his view that any open system 'may attain a time-independent dynamic equilibrium of steady state' (fliessgleichgewicht) that remains irreversibly constant at a macroscopic level holistically, while the system simultaneously evolves over time with continuous flux of matter, energy and information. He concluded that a steady state for a complex open systems can be defined by a process of minimum entropy production with decrease in system overall entropy and increased stability following the entropy equation of Prigogine: dS = deS+diS, where deS represents delta entropy vis import and is always positive and diS is internal delta entropy production from irreversible interactions which may be positive or negative.  

In Bertalanffy's model, the theorist defined general principles of open systems and the limitations of conventional models. He ascribed applications to biology, information theory and cybernetics. Concerning biology, examples from the open systems view suggested they "may suffice to indicate briefly the large fields of application" that could be the "outlines of a wider generalization;"</ref>Bertalanffy, L. von, (1969). General System Theory. New York: George Braziller, pp. 139-1540<science]]s, Bertalanffy did believe that general systems concepts were applicable, e.g. theories that had been introduced into the field of sociology from a modern systems approach that included "the concept of general system, of feedback, information, communication, etc." The theorist critiqued classical "atomistic" conceptions of social systems and ideation "such as 'social physics' as was often attempted in a reductionist spirit." Bertalanffy also recognized difficulties with the application of a new general theory to social science due to the complexity of the intersections between natural sciences and human social systems. However, the theory still encouraged new developments in many fields, from sociology to anthropology, economics, political science, and psychology among other areas. Today, Bertalanffy's GST remains a bridge for interdisciplinary study of systems in the social sciences.

Publications 
 1928, Kritische Theorie der Formbildung, Borntraeger. In English: Modern Theories of Development: An Introduction to Theoretical Biology, Oxford University Press, New York: Harper, 1933
 1928, Nikolaus von Kues, G. Müller, München 1928.
 1930, Lebenswissenschaft und Bildung, Stenger, Erfurt 1930
 1937, Das Gefüge des Lebens, Leipzig: Teubner.
 1940, Vom Molekül zur Organismenwelt, Potsdam: Akademische Verlagsgesellschaft Athenaion.
 1949, Das biologische Weltbild, Bern: Europäische Rundschau. In English: Problems of Life: An Evaluation of Modern Biological and Scientific Thought, New York: Harper, 1952.
 1953, Biophysik des Fliessgleichgewichts, Braunschweig: Vieweg. 2nd rev. ed. by W. Beier and R. Laue, East Berlin: Akademischer Verlag, 1977
 1953, "Die Evolution der Organismen", in Schöpfungsglaube und Evolutionstheorie, Stuttgart: Alfred Kröner Verlag, pp 53–66
 1955, "An Essay on the Relativity of Categories." Philosophy of Science, Vol. 22, No. 4, pp. 243–263.
 1959, Stammesgeschichte, Umwelt und Menschenbild, Schriften zur wissenschaftlichen Weltorientierung Vol 5. Berlin: Lüttke
 1962, Modern Theories of Development, New York: Harper
 1967, Robots, Men and Minds: Psychology in the Modern World, New York: George Braziller, 1969 hardcover: , paperback: 
 1968, General System Theory: Foundations, Development, Applications, New York: George Braziller, revised edition 1976: 
 1968, The Organismic Psychology and Systems Theory, Heinz Werner lectures, Worcester: Clark University Press.
 1975, Perspectives on General Systems Theory. Scientific-Philosophical Studies, E. Taschdjian (eds.), New York: George Braziller, 
 1981, A Systems View of Man: Collected Essays, editor Paul A. LaViolette, Boulder: Westview Press, 

The first articles from Bertalanffy on general systems theory:
 1945, "Zu einer allgemeinen Systemlehre", Blätter für deutsche Philosophie, 3/4. (Extract in: Biologia Generalis, 19 (1949), 139-164).
 1950, "An Outline of General System Theory", British Journal for the Philosophy of Science 1, p. 114-129.
 1951, "General system theory – A new approach to unity of science" (Symposium), Human Biology, Dec. 1951, Vol. 23, p. 303-361.

See also 

 Bowman–Heidenhain hypothesis
 Population dynamics

References

Further reading 
 Sabine Brauckmann (1999). Ludwig von Bertalanffy (1901--1972), ISSS Luminaries of the Systemics Movement, January 1999.
 Peter Corning (2001). Fulfilling von Bertalanffy's Vision: The Synergism Hypothesis as a General Theory of Biological and Social Systems, ISCS 2001.
 Mark Davidson (1983). Uncommon Sense: The Life and Thought of Ludwig Von Bertalanffy, Los Angeles: J. P. Tarcher.
 Debora Hammond (2005). Philosophical and Ethical Foundations of Systems Thinking, tripleC 3(2): pp. 20–27.
 Ervin László eds. (1972). The Relevance of General Systems Theory: Papers Presented to Ludwig Von Bertalanffy on His Seventieth Birthday, New York: George Braziller, 1972.
 David Pouvreau (2013). "Une histoire de la 'systémologie générale' de Ludwig von Bertalanffy - Généalogie, genèse, actualisation et postérité d'un projet herméneutique", Doctoral Thesis (1138 pages), Ecole des Hautes Etudes en Sciences Sociales (EHESS), Paris : http://tel.archives-ouvertes.fr/tel-00804157
 Thaddus E. Weckowicz (1989). Ludwig von Bertalanffy (1901-1972): A Pioneer of General Systems Theory, Center for Systems Research Working Paper No. 89-2. Edmonton AB: University of Alberta, February 1989.

External links

 International Society for the Systems Sciences' biography of Ludwig von Bertalanffy.
  http://isss.org/projects/primer International Society for the Systems Sciences' THE PRIMER PROJECT: INTEGRATIVE SYSTEMICS (organismics)
 Bertalanffy Center for the Study of Systems Science BCSSS in Vienna.
 Ludwig von Bertalanffy (1901-1972): A Pioneer of General Systems Theory working paper by T.E. Weckowicz, University of Alberta Center for Systems Research.
 Ludwig von Bertalanffy, General System Theory - Passages (1968)

1901 births
1972 deaths
Austrian biologists
Systems biologists
Systems scientists
Theoretical biologists
Austrian emigrants to the United States
Academic staff of the University of Alberta
Academic staff of the Université de Montréal
Academic staff of the University of Ottawa
Austrian people of Hungarian descent
Austrian untitled nobility
Scientists from Vienna
People from Liesing
Hungarian nobility
Nobility in the Nazi Party
Center for Advanced Study in the Behavioral Sciences fellows
Scientists from Ontario
20th-century Canadian biologists